The Volleyball 2018–19 V.League Division 1 Women's was the 25th tournament year and the 1st top level women's tournament of the newly branded and reorganized V.League (Japan). It was held from November 3, 2018 – April 13, 2019.

Clubs

Personnel

Foreign players
The total number of foreign players is restricted to one per club. Player from Southeast Asia nations are exempt from these restrictions.

Transfer players

Stadiums

Season standing procedure
The teams will be ranked by the most point gained per match as follows:
Match won 3–0 or 3–1: 3 points for the winner, 0 points for the loser
Match won 3–2: 2 points for the winner, 1 point for the loser
Match forfeited: 3 points for the winner, 0 points (0–25, 0–25, 0–25) for the loser
 In the event of a tie, the following first tiebreaker will apply: Total number of victories (matches won, matched lost) 
 If teams are still tied after examining points gained and the number of victories, then the results to break the tie will be examined in the following order:
Set quotient: if two or more teams are tied on total number of victories, they will be ranked by the quotient resulting from the division of the number of all set won by the number of all sets lost.
Points quotient: if the tie persists based on the set quotient, the teams will be ranked by the quotient resulting from the division of all points scored by the total of points lost during all sets.
If the tie persists based on the point quotient, the tie will be broken based on the team that won the match of the Round Robin Phase between the tied teams. When the tie in point quotient is between three or more teams, these teams ranked taking into consideration only the matches involving the teams in question.

Regular round

Standings

Western Conference

Updated to match(es) played on 23 February 2019.
Source: Western Conference Ranking Table V.league Division 1 Women's 2018–19

Eastern Conference

Updated to match(es) played on 23 February 2019
Source: Eastern Conference Ranking Table V.league Division 1 Women's 2018–19

Positions by week

Western Conference

Eastern Conference

Results by match played

Western Conference

Eastern Conference

Results table

Western Conference

Leg 1

Leg 2

Eastern Conference

Leg 1

Leg 2

Interchange

Leg 1

Leg 2

Head-to-head results

Results

Week 1
 All times are Japan Standard Time (UTC+09:00).
Venue: Nices Arena, Yurihonjo
Venue: Komazawa Gymnasium, Tokyo
Venue: Osaka Municipal Central Gymnasium, Osaka

|}

Week 2
 All times are Japan Standard Time (UTC+09:00).
Venue: Beikomu Total Gymnastics, Amagasaki
Venue: Kanazawa City General Gymnasium, Kanazawa

|}

Week 3
 All times are Japan Standard Time (UTC+09:00).
Venue: Wing Arena Kariya, Kariya
Venue: Ageo Citizen Gymnasium, Ageo
Venue: YKK Kurobe Gymnastics, Kurobe

|}

Week 4
 All times are Japan Standard Time (UTC+09:00).
Venue: Momotaro Arena, Okayama
Venue: Ishikawa Sports Center, Kanazawa
Venue: Tsu City Industry and Sports Center, Tsu
Venue: Ota City General Gymnasium, Ōta, Tokyo

|}

Week 5
 All times are Japan Standard Time (UTC+09:00).
Venue: Ukaruchan Arena, Otsu
Venue: Kobe Green Arena, Kobe
Venue: Fukaya City General Stadium, Fukaya
Venue: Kawasaki City Todoroki Arena, Kawasaki

|}

Week 6
 All times are Japan Standard Time (UTC+09:00).
Venue: Hitachinaka City General Sports Park Gymnasium, Hitachinaka
Venue: Saga Prefecture General Gymnasium, Saga
Venue: Hasuda-shi General Citizen Gymnasium, Hasuda

|}

Week 7
 All times are Japan Standard Time (UTC+09:00).
Venue: Kurobe-shi General Physical Education Center, Kurobe

|}

Week 8
 All times are Japan Standard Time (UTC+09:00).
Venue: Wink Gymnasium, Himeji
Venue: Sakura Ward Hall, Saitama
Venue: Momotaro Arena, Okayama
Venue: Kakogawa Municipal General Gymnasium, Kakogawa

|}

Week 9
 All times are Japan Standard Time (UTC+09:00).
Venue: Funabashi Arena, Funabashi
Venue: Ishikawa Sports Center, Kanazawa
Venue: Saga Prefecture General Gymnasium, Saga

|}

Week 10
 All times are Japan Standard Time (UTC+09:00).
Venue: Momotaro Arena, Okayama
Venue: Kawasaki City Todoroki Arena, Kawasaki

|}

Week 11
 All times are Japan Standard Time (UTC+09:00).
Venue: Kobe Green Arena, Kobe
Venue: Wing Arena Kariya, Kariya
Venue: Ishikawa Sports Center, Kanazawa
Venue: Horaiya Koriyama General Gymnasium, Koriyama

|}

Week 12
 All times are Japan Standard Time (UTC+09:00).
Venue: Ukaruchan Arena, Otsu
Venue: Kawasaki City Todoroki Arena, Kawasaki
Venue: Kurobe-shi General Physical Education Center, Kurobe

|}

Week 13
 All times are Japan Standard Time (UTC+09:00).
Venue: Momotaro Arena, Okayama
Venue: Ikenokawa Sakura Arena, Ibaraki
Venue: Nishio Municipal Gymnasium, Nishio
Venue: Ehime Prefecture Budokan, Matsuyama

|}

Week 14
 All times are Japan Standard Time (UTC+09:00).
Venue: Nippon Steel Sumikin Sakai Gymnasium, Sakai

|}

Final stage

Final 8

Standing Procedure
 Total points (match points of final 8 and the ranking points of regular round)
Ranking points of regular round; From each Conference: 1st place – 6 point, 2nd place – 4 point, 3rd place – 2 point, 4th place – 0 point
 In the event of a tie, the following first tiebreaker will apply: The ranking points of regular round
 If teams are still tied after examining total points and the ranking points of regular round, then the FIVB will examine the results in order to break the tie in the following order:
The teams will be ranked by the most point gained per match in Final 8 as follows:
Match won 3–0 or 3–1: 3 points for the winner, 0 points for the loser
Match won 3–2: 2 points for the winner, 1 point for the loser
Match forfeited: 3 points for the winner, 0 points (0–25, 0–25, 0–25) for the loser
Total number of victories in Final 8 (matches won, matched lost)
Set quotient: if two or more teams are tied on total number of victories, they will be ranked by the quotient resulting from the division of the number of all set won by the number of all sets lost.
Points quotient: if the tie persists based on the set quotient, the teams will be ranked by the quotient resulting from the division of all points scored by the total of points lost during all sets.
If the tie persists based on the point quotient, the tie will be broken based on the team that won the match of the Round Robin Phase between the tied teams. When the tie in point quotient is between three or more teams, these teams ranked taking into consideration only the matches involving the teams in question.

Standings

Results

Final 3

|}

Final

|}

All–Star Game

Final standing

Awards

Most Valuable Player
Foluke Akinradewo
Best Setter
Nanami Seki
Best Middle Blockers
Foluke Akinradewo
Sinead Jack
Fighting Spirit
Jana Kulan

Best Outside Hitters
Brankica Mihajlovic
Jana Kulan
Best Opposite Hitter
Risa Shinnabe
Best Libero
Mako Kobata
Best Newcomer
Nanami Seki

Statistics leaders

Regular round
The statistics of each group follows the vis reports. The statistics include 4 volleyball skills; serve, reception, spike, and block. The table below shows the top 10 ranked players in each skill plus top scorers at the completion of the Regular Round.
.

See also
 2018–19 V.League Division 1 Men's

References

External links
 Official website 

V.Premier League Women
V.Premier League Women
Women's
2018 in Japanese sport
2019 in Japanese sport